"Greater Grand Forks" (officially the Grand Forks, ND-MN Metropolitan Statistical Area) is the name used by some people to designate the twin cities of Grand Forks, North Dakota and East Grand Forks, Minnesota, together with their surrounding areas. The two cities lie directly across from each other on both sides of the Red River of the North, but Grand Forks, with a population of 59,166, is more than five times larger than East Grand Forks, with a population of 9,176. The metropolitan area includes all of the related two counties in the two states: Grand Forks County in North Dakota and Polk County in Minnesota. As of the 2020 census, the MSA had a population of 104,362, and in 2021 estimates placed the total population at 103,462.

The metropolitan area is also sometimes called "The Forks."  Several years ago local promoters attempted to "brand" the metropolitan area as "The Grand Cities."  This name has not found widespread use in the area, although several buildings and organizations now bear the "Grand Cities" title.  Occasionally, the city of Grand Forks uses the nickname "The Sunflake City."

Communities

Places with more than 50,000 inhabitants
Grand Forks, ND (Principal city)

Places with 5,000 to 10,000 inhabitants
Crookston, MN
East Grand Forks, MN

Places with 1,000 to 5,000 inhabitants
Fosston, MN
Grand Forks Air Force Base
Larimore, ND
Thompson, ND

Places with fewer than 1,000 inhabitants
Beltrami, MN
Climax, MN
Emerado, ND
Erskine, MN
Fertile, MN
Fisher, MN
Gilby, ND
Gully, MN
Inkster, ND
Lengby, MN
Manvel, ND
McIntosh, MN
Mentor, MN
Niagara, ND
Nielsville, MN
Northwood, ND
Reynolds, ND
Trail, MN
Winger, MN

Unincorporated places
Arvilla, ND
Bygland, MN
Calspur, ND
Kelly, ND
Mallory, MN
Mekinock, ND
Merrifield, ND
North Grand Forks, ND
Ojata, ND
Oakville, ND
Powell, ND

Demographics

According to the 2006–2008 American Community Survey, the population of the Greater Grand Forks metro area was 97,260, of which 50.9% were male and 49.1% were female.

Age
 Under 5 years: 6.3%
 5–9 years: 5.5%
 10–14 years: 6.1%
 15–19 years: 9.6%
 20–24 years: 13.3%
 25–34 years: 12.7%
 35–44 years: 11.3%
 45–54 years: 13.6%
 55–59 years: 5.4%
 60–64 years: 4.2%
 65–74 years: 5.6%
 75–84 years: 4.5%
 85 years and over: 2.0%
 Median age: 31.8 years

Race
According to the same survey, the racial composition was as follows:

 White: 92.5% (Non-Hispanic Whites: 90.8%)
 Black or African American: 1.3%
 American Indian: 2.4%
 Asian: 0.8%
 Native Hawaiian and Other Pacific Islander: 0.0%
 Some other race: 1.7%
 Two or more races: 1.3%
 Hispanic or Latino (of any race): 3.6%

Ancestry
According to the 2006–2008 American Community Survey, the top ten European ancestry groups were the following:

 Norwegian: 38.8%
 German: 32.9%
 Irish: 9.4%
 Swedish: 6.4%
 Polish: 6.2%
 French: 6.1%
 English: 5.2%
 Czech: 2.5%
 American: 2.2%
 French Canadian: 1.8%

Language spoken at home
Population 5 years and over: 91,118
 English only: 95.1%
 Language other than English: 4.9%
 Spanish: 2.3%
 Other Indo-European languages: 2.1%
 Asian and Pacific Islander languages: 0.4%
 Other languages: 0.1%

Education

K-12

Public schools
The Grand Forks Public Schools system serves Grand Forks and Grand Forks Air Force Base. The district consists of 12 elementary schools, four middle schools, two high schools, an alternative high school, an adult learning center, and a Head Start program.

The East Grand Forks School District serves East Grand Forks and the surrounding rural areas. The district consists of two elementary schools, a middle school, and a high school.

The Crookston School District 593 serves Crookston and the surrounding rural areas. The district consists of two elementary schools and a high school.

Private schools
In Grand Forks, St. Michael's Catholic Church and Holy Family Catholic Church both have Catholic elementary schools. There are no Catholic middle or high schools in Grand Forks, but East Grand Forks is home to Sacred Heart Catholic Church's school, which educates from kindergarten through the 12th grade. East Grand Forks is also home to Riverside Christian School, a nondenominational elementary school.

Higher education
University of North Dakota (Grand Forks)
Northland Community & Technical College (East Grand Forks)*
University of Minnesota Crookston (Crookston)

*also has a campus in Thief River Falls, Minnesota

Media
See Media in Grand Forks, North Dakota for a list of newspapers, television stations, and radio stations

Print
The major daily newspaper is the Grand Forks Herald. The only other daily newspaper in the area is the Crookston Daily Times of Crookston.  The Exponent of East Grand Forks is a weekly newspaper.  The Dakota Student is a campus newspaper published twice a week (during the school year) by students of the University of North Dakota.  There are also several other weekly newspapers in the area including the Hillsboro Banner.

Television
The metropolitan area receives all major broadcast networks over the air, along with cable, and satellite television. The major cable television company is Midcontinent Communications.

The only broadcast stations based in the metro area are WDAZ-TV 8 (ABC) and KCPM 27 (MNTV). KVLY-TV and KRDK-TV both have news bureaus in Grand Forks, though the stations are based in Fargo.

Local TV stations include:
KRDK-TV Channel 4 (CBS) – based in Fargo, ND (digital channel 38)
WDAZ-TV Channel 8 (ABC)
WDAZ-DT2, digital channel 8.2, Cable channel 7 (The CW)
KBRR Channel 10 (Fox) – rebroadcasts KVRR of Fargo, ND
KVLY-TV Channel 11 (NBC)
KCGE Digital Channel 16 (PBS) – main studio in Fargo, ND, cable channel 13
K17HG Channel 17 (3ABN) – religious programming – Digital cable channel 192
KCPM Channel 27 (MNTV) – cable channel 9
K49FF Channel 49 (TBN) – religious programming, (Digital cable channel 73, 190 & 109.7)

Radio
See Media in Grand Forks, North Dakota for a list of all radio stations
There are several radio stations available in the area. All of the commercial radio stations in Grand Forks are owned by either Clear Channel Communications or Leighton Broadcasting. The area is also served by stations of North Dakota Public Radio (KUND 89.3 FM and KFJM 90.7 FM) and Minnesota Public Radio (KQMN 91.5 FM classical music and KNTN 102.7 FM news/talk). Several religious organizations have Christian radio stations throughout the area.

See also
North Dakota statistical areas

Notes

 
Metropolitan areas of North Dakota
Metropolitan areas of Minnesota